Catholic-Hierarchy.org is an online database of bishops and dioceses of the Roman Catholic Church and the 23 Eastern Catholic Churches that are in full communion with Rome. The website is not officially sanctioned by the Church. It is run as a private project by David M. Cheney in Kansas City.

Origin and contents
In the 1990s, David M. Cheney created a simple internet website that documented the Roman Catholic bishops in his home state of Texas—many of whom did not have webpages. In 2002, after moving to the Midwest, he officially created the present website catholic-hierarchy.org and expanded to cover the United States and eventually the world. The database contains geographical, organizational and address information on each Catholic diocese in the world, including Eastern Catholic Churches in full communion with the Holy See, such as the Maronite Catholic Church and the Syro-Malabar Church.

It also gives biographical information on current and previous bishops of each diocese, such as dates of birth, ordinations and (when applicable) death.

Status
The Zenit News Agency states that the webpage provides a "silent, unique service to the Church".

Sources
Among the printed sources used are the Holy See publications: Annuario Pontificio, Acta Apostolicae Sedis and Acta Sanctae Sedis. Historical studies by authors whose surnames range from Andrade to Zúñíga are also utilized. Resignations, appointments and assignments of bishops to new dioceses are derived from the bulletin of the Vatican Informazioni Service (VIS).

References

Further reading

External links

2002 in Christianity
Catholic websites
Episcopacy in the Catholic Church